Janardan Swami (c. 1504 - c. 1575), or simply Janardan or Janardana was an Indian Hindu scholar, statesman, poet and saint. He was the spiritual guru of prominent 16th-century saint Eknath. His compositions were mostly written in Marathi. He also wrote a few verses in Braj.

Biography
Janardan Swami was born into a Deshastha Rigvedi Brahmin, Deshpande family at Chalisgaon, Maharashtra. They belong to Ashvalayana Sutra and Shakala Shakha. His parents reportedly subscribed to the Asvalayana tradition and were probably adherents of the school of thought initiated by the 8th-century philosopher Adi Shankaracharya.

Janardan Swami was a devotee of the Hindu deity Dattatreya. He was appointed as Killedar or governor of the fort at Daulatabad (previously Devagiri) by its contemporary Muslim occupants.

According to legend, Dattatreya once conversed with Janardan Swami inside a cave within the fort perimeters at Daulatbad. It is also believed that during one of his tours to Ankalakopa, Dattatreya again appeared before him as Narasimha Saraswati. Narsimha Saraswati was an earlier saint and spiritual master and is widely considered to be the second incarnation of Dattatreya. He is thought to have initiated Janardan Swami under a cluster fig (audumbara) tree. Janardan Swami had disciples of various social classes and even Indian and Turkic Muslims. Among his disciples, Eknath is considered the most significant while Ramajanardana and Janijanardana are his other well-known disciples.

Very few details of Janardan Swami's life are known. On one occasion, he had probably instructed Eknath to embark on a pilgrimage. It is thought that he accompanied his disciple until Trimbakeshwar, a Hindu pilgrimage town near Nashik, Maharashtra.

He has composed considerable volumes of devotional poetry, known as abhanga.

Janardan Swami breathed his last at Daulatabad where he is believed to have undergone Mahasamadhi. His samadhi shrine is located within a cave on a hill at Daulatabad.

See also
Eknath, his principal disciple
Dnyaneshwar
Namdev

References

External links
http://santeknath.org/jivangatha.html 
Savitribai Khanolkar, Saints of Maharashtra, published by Bharatiya Vidya Bhavan, Mumbai, 3rd Edition, 2000.
 https://www.santsahitya.in/sant-janardan/

Marathi-language writers
Marathi-language poets
Warkari
16th-century Hindu philosophers and theologians
Bhakti movement
16th-century Indian philosophers
16th-century Hindu religious leaders
Scholars from Maharashtra
People from Jalgaon